Einar Axel Malmstrom (July 14, 1907 – August 21, 1954) was a Colonel in the United States Air Force. He was a P-47 Thunderbolt fighter pilot and commanding officer of the 356th Fighter Group of the 8th Air Force during World War II. He was shot down in 1944 and was a prisoner of war in Stalag Luft I from April 1944 through May 1945.

National Guard
Malmstrom joined the Washington National Guard on May 12, 1929, and was commissioned a second lieutenant on May 25, 1931.

World War II

Malmstrom was called to active service as a first lieutenant on September 16, 1940, at Parkwater, Washington. He was sent to Europe in May 1943 and took command of the 356th Fighter Group at RAF Martlesham Heath. 

On April 24, 1944, he was shot down over France and taken prisoner by the German Army. He spent a year in captivity at Stalag Luft I where he was American commander of the south compound. For this he was awarded a Bronze Star.

Cold War
Malmstrom returned to the U.S. in May 1945 and was assigned as Air Inspector for the 312th Base Unit in Barksdale, Louisiana, the XIX Tactical Air Command at Biggs Field, Texas, and at Greenville, South Carolina. He was Deputy for Reserve Forces for the 9th Air Force until August 1949 when he entered the Air War College. He was then a senior Air Force instructor at the Army War College. He was Director of Personnel at Lockbourne Air Force Base. In February 1954 he was assigned to Great Falls Air Force Base in Montana, as Deputy Wing Commander of the 407th Strategic Fighter Wing.

Death
Malmstrom was killed in a Lockheed T-33 fighter jet crash near Great Falls Air Force Base in Montana on August 21, 1954.

Malmstrom Air Force Base
Great Falls Air Force Base was renamed Malmstrom Air Force Base in his honor in October 1955.

References

1907 births
1954 deaths
American people of Swedish descent
Aviators from Illinois
Military personnel from Illinois
United States Army Air Forces pilots of World War II
American prisoners of war in World War II
World War II prisoners of war held by Germany
Aviators killed in aviation accidents or incidents in the United States
Victims of aviation accidents or incidents in 1954
 Accidental deaths in Montana
United States Army Air Forces officers
United States Air Force colonels
Recipients of the Air Medal